Prepare the Preparations is the third full-length studio album by St. Louis band Ludo.  It is the band's second release on Island Records.  The album was originally scheduled for an August 17 release date, but was pushed back to September 7, 2010.

Album information

The album was produced by Matt Wallace. The lead single off the album is "Whipped Cream." Topics on the new album include, "skeletons, pirates, cyborgs, robots, leprechauns, witches, curses, Bonnie and Clyde and 1950s R&B." Volpe said of the new album, "I like to write from my imagination, so there are songs about skeletons, grave robbing lovers, a cyclops and of course love and all that stuff."

Track listing

Members
Band
Andrew Volpe - Vocals, Guitar
Tim Ferrell - Guitar, Backing Vocals
Tim Convy - Moog, Backing Vocals
Matt Palermo - Drums, Backing Vocals
Additional Musicians
Tommy Cantillon - Bass Guitar
Matt Bowen - Violin, programming
Tim Christensen - Upright Bass
Marc McClusky - Programming, loops

References

Ludo (band) albums
2010 albums
Albums produced by Matt Wallace
Island Records albums